Roy John Proverbs (8 July 1932 – 15 February 2017) was an English professional footballer. His clubs included Coventry City, Bournemouth & Boscombe Athletic and Gillingham, where he made over 140 Football League appearances. He played primarily at right full back throughout his career. During his time at Gillingham, he was given the nickname "Chopper" Proverbs due to his no-nonsense style of defending.

References

1932 births
2017 deaths
Sportspeople from Wednesbury
English footballers
Association football defenders
Stratford Town F.C. players
Coventry City F.C. players
AFC Bournemouth players
Canterbury City F.C. players
Tunbridge Wells F.C. players
Gillingham F.C. players
Banbury United F.C. players
English Football League players